The One Hell of a Nite Tour was the sixth concert tour by American singer Chris Brown to support his seventh studio album, Royalty.

Tour dates

References

2015 concert tours
Chris Brown concert tours